Padre Redento Baranzano born Giovanni Antonio Baranzano (4 February 1590 – 23 December 1622) was an Italian Barnabite priest, astronomer and writer who wrote a pamphlet Uranoscopia (1617) which supported a Copernican sun-centric planetary system. He was forced by the church to retract his publication. 

Baranzano was born in Serravalle Sesia and studied at Crevalcuore, Vercelli, Novara and Milan. He became a Barnabite on 11 March 1609 and took the name Redento. His education at Monz was in religion, philosophy, Latin, Greek, Hebrew, and Chaldaic. In 1615 he taught at Collège Chappuisien in Annecy against he Calvinists but also began to examine scientific ideas. He was a friend of Galileo Galilei and of Francis Bacon, who told Baranzano, before anybody else, about his Novum Organum. Baranzano published a note on physics Novae opiniones physicae (1619) but he is best known because of his tract on astronomy begun in 1617 which accepted a heliocentric view and opposed Aristotle's ideas. This book Uranoscopia seu De coelo was published in 1619 by Jean Pillehotte in Lyon. He was called to Milan by the Archbishop and asked to make corrections to his writings. He wrote a tract to retract his ideas in Nova de motu terrae Copernican iuxta Summi Pontificis mentem disputatio (1618). After 1620 he went to teach at Montargis where he died after two years.

References

External links 
 Uranoscopia Seu De Coelo (1817)
 Novae Opiniones physicae (part 1) (part 2)

Barnabites
17th-century Italian astronomers
1590 births
1622 deaths